Shobe-Morrison House is a historic home located near Morrison, Gasconade County, Missouri. The original section was built between about 1828 and 1830, with an addition made about 1840. It is a two-story, log I-house with a weatherboard exterior and Federal style woodwork.  Also on the property is the contributing old slave quarters.

It was listed on the National Register of Historic Places in 1983.

References

Houses on the National Register of Historic Places in Missouri
Federal architecture in Missouri
Houses completed in 1830
Buildings and structures in Gasconade County, Missouri
National Register of Historic Places in Gasconade County, Missouri
Slave cabins and quarters in the United States